Syed Muhammad Zafar (born 6th of December 1930) is one of the more prominent Pakistani human rights activists, a noted lawyer (Senior Advocate Supreme Court), a politician and a former member of the  Senate of Pakistan. For some time, he was affiliated with the Pakistan Muslim League (Q).

Career
Zafar began his career as a lawyer in the 1950s. He played an important role during the 1958 imposition of martial law in Pakistan and again in forcing amendments to Constitution of Pakistan of 1962, which at first did not have sufficient protections for basic human rights. After serving as a judge of the high court and as Pakistan's Minister for Law and Justice from 1965 to 1969, Zafar retired from the government in 1968 and started his own law practice.

Zafar and a few of his contemporaries founded the Human Rights Society of Pakistan in 1976.

He was awarded an honorary PhD degree in law at the University of the Punjab's 124th convocation. He retired from active law practice in 2014.

Official posts 
Federal Minister for Law and Justice (Pakistan) (1965–69)
President High Court Bar Association, Lahore (1975)
President, Pakistan's Supreme Court Bar Association (1979)
Chairman, Human Right Society of Pakistan
Chairman, Cultural Association of Pakistan
Chancellor of Hamdard University

News media commentator
After retirement from his official government service in 1968, he has been a frequent commentator on current affairs in Pakistan.

Personal life
Zafar was born on 6 December 1930 in Rangoon, Burma, where his father worked in the construction business. His family hailed from the town of Shakargarh in Punjab. Following the Japanese occupation of Burma, his family returned to their native village in 1944.

Bibliography
 Through the Crisis (1971)
 Who is Dictator? (Urdu: Dictator kaun?)
 People, Parliament and Islam (Urdu: Awam, parliament and Islam)
 Hajj – A Journey in Obedience
 Views & Reviews (Urdu: Tazkaray-Jaizay)
 Understanding Statutes (1997)
 My Popular Law Cases (Urdu: Mere Mashoor Mukkadamay) (میرے مشہور مقدمے)
 Pakistan Benaam Corruption (Urdu translation: Awam KI Adalat Mein)
 Politics in the Court of Law (Urdu: Adalat Mein Siyasat)
 Dialogues on the Political Chess Board
 Be a Competent Lawyer (2014)

References

External links 
August/September 1996, Page 78 Meet the Pakistanis S.M. Zafar—An Effective Legal Advocate for Human Rights by Richard H. Curtiss

Living people
1930 births
Members of the Senate of Pakistan
Pakistani civil rights activists
Pakistani expatriates in Myanmar
Pakistani human rights activists
Pakistani lawyers
Pakistan Muslim League (Q) politicians
People from Narowal District
Punjabi people
People from Lahore